Menemerus plenus is a species of jumping spider in the genus Menemerus that lives in Yemen. The female was first described in 1994.

References

Invertebrates of the Arabian Peninsula
Salticidae
Spiders of Asia
Spiders described in 1994